Leonard Roy White (23 March 1930 – 17 June 1994) was an English professional footballer who played as a centre-forward, most noted for playing at Newcastle United. He is Newcastle United's third highest goalscorer of all-time.

Biography
Born in Skellow, West Riding of Yorkshire, a small village near Doncaster, White started his career at Upton Colliery before moving to Rotherham United and progressing through the Millers youth and reserve teams. Although originally a centre forward, he developed his skills as a winger too. It was in the latter position that he made  his league debut, scoring in a 5–0 victory over Wrexham in August 1950. He scored six goals in his first six first-team games. With winger Jack Grainger already established in the Millers team, White's appearances were limited, but in 1952 an injury to centre forward Jack Shaw, led to Grainger being switched to the central striker role, and White again playing as a winger. He was in great form and was selected for the FA national team in fixtures against the Army and the RAF. Those FA representative games brought him to the attention of the First Division clubs and he joined Newcastle United in 1953 for £12,500 - a relatively high amount at the time. The signing of White came following two recent FA Cup successes for Newcastle. (Reference - "Millmoor Personalities", David Watson, Rotherham Metropolitan Borough Council, 1986)

At Newcastle, White was primarily partnered up front alongside the well-established Jackie Milburn during the 1950s. Because of this, White often found himself in the shadows. Despite that, he had an impressive goalscoring tally and was instrumental during Newcastle's FA Cup-winning campaign of 1955.
Once Milburn ended his career in the late 1950s, White took over as the leading striker, and continued to improve his ratio of goals. He eventually left the club for Huddersfield Town in 1962.

White is currently the third highest goalscorer in history of Newcastle United with 153 goals. He is behind Jackie Milburn with 200 goals and Alan Shearer with 206 goals.

White died in Huddersfield in June 1994.

Len White's brother Jack White was also a professional footballer playing centre half for Aldershot and Bristol City before managing non league Cambridge City and Wellington Town.

Personal life 
White was married to his wife Joyce  till his death in 1994.

References

External links
Statistics and profile 

1930 births
1994 deaths
People from the Metropolitan Borough of Doncaster
English footballers
Association football forwards
English Football League players
Upton Colliery F.C. players
Rotherham United F.C. players
Stockport County F.C. players
Newcastle United F.C. players
Huddersfield Town A.F.C. players
Footballers from Doncaster
English Football League representative players
FA Cup Final players